The Hakel is a palaeontological formation located in Lebanon. It dates to the Cretaceous period.

See also 
 List of fossil sites

References
  (1993); Wildlife of Gondwana. Reed. 

Geology of Lebanon
Cretaceous paleontological sites of Asia
Lagerstätten
Paleontology in Lebanon